Inositol-polyphosphate multikinase (IpK2, IP3/IP4 6-/3-kinase, IP3/IP4 dual-specificity 6-/3-kinase, IpmK, ArgRIII, AtIpk2alpha, AtIpk2beta, inositol polyphosphate 6-/3-/5-kinase) is an enzyme with systematic name ATP:1D-myo-inositol-1,4,5-trisphosphate 6-phosphotransferase. This enzyme catalyses the following chemical reaction

 2 ATP + 1D-myo-inositol 1,4,5-trisphosphate  2 ADP + 1D-myo-inositol 1,3,4,5,6-pentakisphosphate (overall reaction)
(1a) ATP + 1D-myo-inositol 1,4,5-trisphosphate  ADP + 1D-myo-inositol 1,4,5,6-tetrakisphosphate
(1b) ATP + 1D-myo-inositol 1,4,5,6-tetrakisphosphate  ADP + 1D-myo-inositol 1,3,4,5,6-pentakisphosphate

This enzyme also phosphorylates Ins(1,4,5)P3 to Ins(1,3,4,5)P4, Ins(1,3,4,5)P4 to Ins(1,3,4,5,6)P5, and Ins(1,3,4,5,6)P4 to Ins(PP)P4, isomer unknown.

References 

EC 2.7.1